Barbara Maria Karel Deckx (born 22 January 1974), better known by her stage name Barbara Dex, is a Belgian singer who represented her country in the Eurovision Song Contest 1993 with the song "Iemand als jij".

Dex had qualified via the Belgian national heat, Eurosong 93, held at the Casino Knokke on 6 March. At the Eurovision in Millstreet, she performed seventh, after Greece's entry "Ellada, Hora Tou Fotos" and before Malta's song "This Time". Dex came last, in 25th place.

Barbara returned to the Belgian final in 2004, teaming up with Alides for the song "One Life" which placed third. A further Eurovision attempt came in 2006 with the country line-dancing flavoured "Crazy" which earned her fifth place.

Barbara Dex was born in Turnhout, one of the three children of Marcel Deckx, a Belgian singer better known by his stage name Marc Dex. Her brother Tom Deckx has played bass guitar in the musical groups Tush and Nuts.

In Eurovision, Barbara wore a self-made dress, which inspired House of Eurovision's Barbara Dex Award for the contestant with the worst (later, "most striking") outfit.

Discography 
Dex has released several albums between 1993 and 2011.

Albums 
First album Iemand contains songs in Dutch. Since 1994 she has performed songs only in English.
 Iemand (1993)
 Waiting for a New Moon (1994)
 Tender Touch (1996)
 Strong (1998)
 Timeless (2001)
 Enjoy: a Taste of Gospel (2003)
 Blue-eyed Girl (2006)
 Only One Me (2008)
 I Am Barbara Dex (2011)
 Dex, Drugs & Rock 'n Roll (2016)

Singles 
 "One life" (2004)
 "Crazy" (2006)
 "I am" (2010)
 "Before" (2011)

Barbara Dex Award 
Since 1997 the Barbara Dex Award is an annual fan award for the worst dressed artist in the Eurovision Song Contest. From 1997 to 2016, it was awarded by fansite House of Eurovision, and from 2017 onwards, it has been awarded by songfestival.be.

References

External links 

  
 

1974 births
Living people
People from Turnhout
Eurovision Song Contest entrants for Belgium
Eurovision Song Contest entrants of 1993
Dutch-language singers of Belgium
21st-century Belgian women singers
21st-century Belgian singers